Hauraki is a suburb located on the southern North Shore of Auckland, the largest metropolitan city in New Zealand. It is under the local governance of the Auckland Council.

History

The traditional name for the western coastline in Hauraki was Waipaoraora, referring to the shell banks on the tidal flats of Shoal Bay.

Demographics

Hauraki had a population of 4,131 at the 2018 New Zealand census, an increase of 162 people (4.1%) since the 2013 census, and an increase of 339 people (8.9%) since the 2006 census. There were 1,434 households, comprising 1,998 males and 2,133 females, giving a sex ratio of 0.94 males per female. The median age was 37.0 years (compared with 37.4 years nationally), with 861 people (20.8%) aged under 15 years, 774 (18.7%) aged 15 to 29, 1,977 (47.9%) aged 30 to 64, and 522 (12.6%) aged 65 or older.

Ethnicities were 73.3% European/Pākehā, 6.0% Māori, 2.4% Pacific peoples, 22.6% Asian, and 3.3% other ethnicities. People may identify with more than one ethnicity.

The percentage of people born overseas was 40.4, compared with 27.1% nationally.

Although some people chose not to answer the census's question about religious affiliation, 56.9% had no religion, 32.6% were Christian, 0.3% had Māori religious beliefs, 1.2% were Hindu, 1.2% were Muslim, 1.4% were Buddhist and 1.5% had other religions.

Of those at least 15 years old, 1,329 (40.6%) people had a bachelor's or higher degree, and 207 (6.3%) people had no formal qualifications. The median income was $44,800, compared with $31,800 nationally. 1,008 people (30.8%) earned over $70,000 compared to 17.2% nationally. The employment status of those at least 15 was that 1,773 (54.2%) people were employed full-time, 459 (14.0%) were part-time, and 96 (2.9%) were unemployed.

Primary school
Hauraki Primary has students from New Entrant to Year Six when they move on to intermediate school. The majority of year sixes transferring to Belmont Intermediate School or Takapuna Normal Intermediate School. School facilities include 14 classrooms, 3 playgrounds, 2 fields, Hall, Music room, Swimming pool and various courts.

History
Hauraki Primary School was established in May 1954 and on Labour Weekend in 2004 the school celebrated its Silver Jubilee. The first few decades involved times without an ICT suite, personal computers, collaborative learning and mufti every day (though as of 2007, uniform is compulsory for all starting students).

In 2000, Clarinda Franklin took over the job of being principal and as of 2022 no one has succeeded her in the job. In the 1990s the school adopted the DARE program which informs year six students about: peer pressure, drugs, smoking and alcohol along with other safety procedures. Also in 2003, Hauraki Primary School introduced the Walking School Bus to the Devonport peninsula, which is a program that gives parents the opportunity to let their children walk to school along with their peers and other students with various parents controlling their walk to school.

In 2005 Hauraki Primary decided to take part in the North Shore Schools kapa haka day which is held at Onepoto Intermediate every year and is a festival for all schools wishing to participate and show off their kapa haka groups. In that year the Kapa Haka role was succeeded by Ali Logan-Daughty who gave the school the idea to participate in the festival. In term 4 of 2007 the Board of Trustees and Parent Teachers Association voted for a change in the school with a huge impact as they unanimously voted towards a school uniform to be introduced for all starting or new students in the school but optional for existing students. Hauraki Primary hopes that in 2010 everyone in the school will be in uniform. The uniform includes a silver shirt/blouse, green shorts/ skirt (skirts are styled to the Westlake Girls High School skirts) grey socks, plain black sandals/polishable black lace up shoes and a hat.

Extracurricular activities
Sporting Opportunities:
Sports available for students from year 3-6
1stXI and 2ndXI Cricket teams playing in a quadrangular tournament annually.
Various hockey teams.
Various netball teams.
Various miniball teams, practise available for players in hall at break times.
A 1stXV (or 2ndXV) rugby team.
Two soccer teams to compete at an annual tournament at Belmont Intermediate School.
Compulsory activities for students during the year include
Swimming Sports, Cross Country and Athletics all with inter-school competitions held a few weeks after.

Extra-curricular activities (for year sixes only; some relation to sport):
Waterwise programs at Narrow Neck Beach in Devonport
A 4-day, 3 night camp in Hunua at the YMCA's Camp Adair.

Cultural opportunities for students year 3-6:
Middle School Choir (Years 3 and 4)
Senior School Choir (Years 5 and 6)
Boys Choir (Year 5 and 6, segment of the Senior Choir)
Kapa Haka Group
School Orchestra
Middle and Senior School Speech Competitions (Compulsory)
School Production held biennially

Notes

External links
 Hauraki School website
 Photographs of Hauraki held in Auckland Libraries' heritage collections. 

Suburbs of Auckland
North Shore, New Zealand
Populated places around the Waitematā Harbour
Populated places around the Hauraki Gulf / Tīkapa Moana